Some four-winged insect orders, such as the Lepidoptera, have developed a wide variety of morphological wing coupling mechanisms in the imago which render these taxa as "functionally dipterous" (effectively two-winged) for efficient insect flight. All but the most basal forms exhibit this wing coupling.

The mechanisms are of three different types - jugal, frenulo-retinacular and amplexiform.

Jugal wing coupling

The more primitive groups of moth have an enlarged lobe-like area near the basal posterior margin, i.e. at the base of the forewing, called jugum, that folds under the hindwing in flight.

Frenulo-retinacular wing coupling

Other groups of moth have a frenulum on the hindwing that hooks under a retinaculum on the forewing. The retinaculum is a hook or tuft on the underside of the forewing of some moths. Along with the frenulum, a spine at the base of the forward or costal edge of the hindwing, it forms a coupling mechanism for the front and rear wings of the moth.

Amplexiform wing coupling

In the butterflies and in the Bombycoidea there is no arrangement of frenulum and retinaculum to couple the wings. Instead, an enlarged  humeral area of the hindwing is broadly overlapped by the forewing. Despite the absence of a specific mechanical connection, the wings overlap and operate in phase. The power stroke of the forewing pushes down the hindwing in unison. This type of coupling is a variation of frenate type but where the frenulum and retinaculum are completely lost.

Notes

References

Sources
 Pinhey, E (1962). Hawk Moths of Central and Southern Africa. Longmans Southern Africa, Cape Town.

Insect anatomy